SS William Patterson was a Liberty ship built in the United States during World War II. She was named after William Patterson, a businessman, a gun-runner during the American Revolution, and a founder of the Baltimore and Ohio Railroad.

Construction
William Patterson was laid down on 29 April 1942, under a Maritime Commission (MARCOM) contract, MCE hull 48, by the Bethlehem-Fairfield Shipyard, Baltimore, Maryland; she was sponsored by Miss Gladys Mitchell, the daughter of John Mitchell, the Baltimore representative of the US Salvage Association, and was launched on 26 June 1942.

History
She was allocated to A.H. Bull & Co., Inc., on 13 July 1942.

On 23 September 1948, she was laid up in the Hudson River Reserve Fleet, Jones Point, New York. On 31 October 1949, she was withdrawn from the fleet to be loaded with grain. She returned loaded on 14 November 1949. On 2 March 1951, she was withdrawn from the fleet to have her load of grain unloaded. On 16 May 1952, she was laid up in the National Defense Reserve Fleet, Wilmington, North Carolina. On 14 September 1955, she was withdrawn from the fleet for test conversion to gas generator fed gas turbine power. Bethlehem Steel, in Baltimore, performed the conversion and she was reclassified EC2-G-8g. The free piston generators provided moderate pressure gas which fed the gas turbines. At trials she ran , above the requested .

After conversion she was transferred to the Military Sea Transportation Service. She was operated by Lykes Brothers Steamship Co., Inc. under a bareboat charter.

On 23 March 1961, she was laid up in the Hudson River Reserve Fleet, Jones Point, New York. She was sold for scrapping on 23 November 1970, to Hierros Ardes, SA., along with three other ships, for $267,070. She was removed from the fleet, 17 January 1971.

References

Bibliography

 
 
 
 
 

 

Liberty ships
1942 ships
Ships built in Baltimore
Wilmington Reserve Fleet
Hudson River Reserve Fleet